Society and Culture in South Asia  is a peer-reviewed journal publishing articles in the fields of sociology, social anthropology in the main, and sociology of education, sociology of medicine, arts and aesthetics, cultural studies, sociology of mass media, sociology of law, urban studies inter alia.

It is published twice a year by SAGE Publications in association with South Asian University, New Delhi.

This journal is a member of the Committee on Publication Ethics (COPE).

Abstracting and indexing 
Society and Culture in South Asia is abstracted and indexed in:
 J-Gate
 Scopus

External links
 
 Homepage

References
 http://www.sau.int/
 http://publicationethics.org/members/

SAGE Publishing academic journals
Biannual journals
Sociology journals
Publications established in 2015